Andre Antonio Wright (born 7 December 1996) is an English footballer who plays as a forward for Stratford Town. During his career Wright has played for clubs in England, Ireland and Scotland.

Career
A product of West Bromwich Albion's academy, Wright was loaned out to Kidderminster Harriers for the first half of the 2015–16 season in order to gain experience of senior football. Wright scored his first senior goal in a 3–1 defeat to Wrexham on 18 August 2015, it was his only goal in 12 league appearances for Kidderminster. The loan spell at Kidderminster was cut short in November 2015 to allow Wright to join fellow National League relegation contenders Torquay United on loan, initially until 2 January 2016. The loan deal was extended until the end of the 2015–16 season, with Wright going on to score three goals in 22 league appearances to help Torquay survive relegation from the National League, at the expense of former club Kidderminster Harriers.

After featuring for West Brom's Under-23 side against Millwall in the EFL Trophy in August 2016, Wright was loaned out to Coventry City until 9 January 2017. Wright scored his first league goal for Coventry City in a 2–2 draw with AFC Wimbledon at the Ricoh Arena, in what would prove to be Tony Mowbray's final game as Coventry City manager.

On 17 January 2017, Wright agreed to join League Two side Yeovil Town on loan until the end of the season, but the deal collapsed on 18 January 2017, due to rules governing the number of clubs a player can represent in one season.

On 1 September 2017, after numerous trials with Football League sides, Wright opted to return to Kidderminster Harriers on a one-year deal.

In July 2019 it was announced that Andre had signed for League of Ireland Premier Division side Bohemians until the end of the 2019 season. Wright scored 4 goals in a single game for Bohs as they defeated fellow Dublin club UCD in August 2019. Andre Wright was named in the PFAI Team of the Year in 2020.

Wright signed for Scottish Championship side, Ayr United, on Burns' Day of 2021. Wright left Ayr at the end of the 2020–21 season.  He spent some time on trial at Notts County during pre-season ahead of their 2021–22 season but was not offered a contract.

On the 17th August 2021, it was announced that Wright had returned to the League of Ireland, signing for Sligo Rovers for the final 4 months of the season.

On 1 January 2022, Wright signed for National League North side AFC Telford United.

On 24 March 2022, Wright signed for National League North side Hereford on a non-contract basis. He was released at the end of the season after making eight league appearances.

On 29 June 2022, Wright joined fellow National League North club Kettering Town. In October 2022, he signed for Southern League Premier Division Central club Stratford Town.

Career statistics

References

External links

1996 births
Living people
English footballers
Association football forwards
West Bromwich Albion F.C. players
Kidderminster Harriers F.C. players
Torquay United F.C. players
Coventry City F.C. players
Nuneaton Borough F.C. players
Gloucester City A.F.C. players
Bohemian F.C. players
Ayr United F.C. players
Sligo Rovers F.C. players
AFC Telford United players
Hereford F.C. players
Kettering Town F.C. players
Stratford Town F.C. players
National League (English football) players
English Football League players
Scottish Professional Football League players
League of Ireland players
Southern Football League players
Expatriate association footballers in the Republic of Ireland